Mervyl Samuel Melendez Jr. (born November 29, 1998) is a Puerto Rican professional baseball catcher for the Kansas City Royals of Major League Baseball (MLB). He made his MLB debut in 2022.

Amateur career
Melendez attended St. James School in Montgomery, Alabama for three years before transferring to Westminster Christian School in Palmetto Bay, Florida for his senior year. He was a member of the United States national team in 2016. He committed to play college baseball at Florida International University. After his senior year, the Kansas City Royals selected him in the second round, 52nd overall, of the 2017 Major League Baseball draft. He signed with Kansas City for $2.1 million.

Professional career
After signing with the Royals, Melendez made his professional debut with the Rookie-level Arizona League Royals where he posted a .262 batting average with four home runs and thirty RBIs over 47 games. He spent 2018 with the Lexington Legends of the Class A South Atlantic League, slashing .251/.322/.492 with 19 home runs and 73 RBIs in 111 games, earning All-Star honors. Melendez spent 2019 with the Wilmington Blue Rocks of the Class A-Advanced Carolina League and was named an All-Star. Over 110 games, he slashed .163/.260/.311 with nine home runs and 54 RBIs. He did not play a minor league game in 2020 since the season was cancelled due to the COVID-19 pandemic. To begin the 2021 season, he was assigned to the Northwest Arkansas Naturals of the Double-A Central. He earned Double-A Central Player of the Month honors for July after batting .333 with 12 home runs over the course of the month. After slashing .285/.372/.628 with 28 home runs and 65 RBIs over 79 games, he was promoted to the Omaha Storm Chasers of the Triple-A East in early August. Over 44 games with Omaha, he slashed .293/.413/.620 with 13 home runs and 38 RBIs. His total of 41 home runs for the season led the minor leagues, and he became the first ever catcher to win the Joe Bauman Home Run Award.

On November 19, 2021, the Royals selected Melendez's contract and added him to the 40-man roster. He returned to Omaha to begin the 2022 season.

On May 2, 2022, MJ was a designated hitter for Omaha. In the game, he was on second base and tagged up to third on a line drive by his teammates to right. His manager came up to him and describes to him that he didn't want to tell him this way. He was called up to the majors that day.

On May 17, 2022, MJ hit his first career home run during a game versus the White Sox off of lefty pitcher Tanner Banks.

Personal life
Melendez's father, Mervyl Melendez, is a college baseball coach. In 2022, he was among ten Royals unable to travel to Canada to play the Toronto Blue Jays due to being unvaccinated against COVID-19, as public health policies of the Canadian government prohibit unvaccinated non-citizens from entering the country (mirroring a Biden administration policy barring unvaccinated foreign nationals from entering the United States).

References

External links

1998 births
Living people
People from Daytona Beach, Florida
Baseball players from Florida
Major League Baseball catchers
Kansas City Royals players
Arizona League Royals players
Lexington Legends players
Wilmington Blue Rocks players
Northwest Arkansas Naturals players
Omaha Storm Chasers players
2023 World Baseball Classic players